Ursogastra was a genus of moths of the family Noctuidae, it is now considered a synonym of Hypotrix.

Species
 Ursogastra lunata Smith, 1906

References
Natural History Museum Lepidoptera genus database
Ursogastra at funet

Hadeninae